The third season of the animated television series, The Boondocks originally aired in the United States on Cartoon Network's late night programming block, Adult Swim. Season three started on May 2, 2010, with "It's a Black President, Huey Freeman" and ended with "It's Goin Down" on August 15, 2010, with a total of fifteen episodes. The season debuted at 2.55 million viewers.

All fifteen episodes from season three were released completely uncensored on a three-disc DVD set in the United States on November 9, 2010. In addition all episodes from season three are available on the iTunes Store.

Production
Sung Dae Kang and Young Chan Kim served as directors for season three, and series creator Aaron McGruder and Rodney Barnes served as writers for season three. All episodes were rated TV-MA for graphic violence, dangerous activity (mostly involving children), explicit language (mostly heavy use of racist, sexist, and homophobic slurs and bleeped-out profanity), and infrequent instances of strong sexual content. Season three was originally announced to be the show's last; it would ultimately be the last season produced with McGruder's involvement. 

The episode "The Story of Jimmy Rebel" was banned after their first showing on Adult Swim for excessive depictions of racism and perceived racial insensitivities over the episode's portrayal of a racist country singer named Jimmy Rebel (a parody of real-life white supremacist country singer Johnny Rebel). The episodes were released as part of the complete series DVD set and Netflix has also streamed the missing episode in Canada.

Season three features guest appearances from Werner Herzog, Bill Maher, DJ Vlad, Charlie Murphy, Edward Asner, Michael Jai White, Aries Spears, John Landis, Clifton Powell, Samuel L. Jackson, Billy Dee Williams, Gina Torres, Mark Hamill, Marion Ross, Kadeem Hardison, Luenell, Don 'D.C.' Curry, Star Jones, and John C. McGinley.

Episodes

Home release
All fifteen episodes from season three were released completely uncensored on a three-disc DVD set in the United States on November 9, 2010. 

In addition all episodes from season three are available on iTunes.

References

The Boondocks (TV series) seasons
2010 American television seasons